Cap-Santé is a town in the Canadian province of Quebec. It is the county seat of Portneuf Regional County Municipality and was as well the county seat of the designated Portneuf County.

The name of the town means "Cape Health". Legend has it that this community's name was coined when soldiers suffering from an unknown disease miraculously recovered from a cure discovered in the village.

The old settlement is situated just west of the nearby Jacques-Cartier River and on the embankment of the Saint Lawrence River.

History 

The first settlers arrived around 1679, and in 1714 the village became an official parish.

The present-day church, a historical-registered building, was built from 1754 to 1767. Interrupted during construction by the Seven Years' War (1756–1763), it is one of the last buildings to be constructed under the French regime. The church has a facade and two towers, a baroque interior, a neoclassical reredos, and two tiers of openings on the bell tower, a presbytery (designed by architect Charles Baillargé in 1849) featuring five neatly lined dormer windows. A cemetery encircles the square, leading to the river below.

The Place de l'Église square is crowned with old wells dating back to 1799. Vieux Chemin street was built along the same geographical line as that Chemin-du-Roy, the first road linking Montreal and Quebec City in the 18th century. Wooden and stone homes dot the narrow and shaded street that borders the cape. The quay is on the Saint Lawrence River.

In 1759 following the defeat of the French at the Battle of the Plains of Abraham during the Seven Years' War, the commander of the French forces, Chevalier de Lévis, ordered the construction of Fort Jacques-Cartier at the mouth of the Jacques-Cartier River from materials originally destined for the construction of a church. The following year, using the fort as a logistics base, Lévis attempted unsuccessfully with 7,000 men to recapture Quebec City from the British. The British captured the fort in September 1760 and kept a garrison there until 1763 after which they abandoned it. Virtually nothing remains of the fort aside from archaeological remains, which is also situated on private land inaccessible to the public on the 'Plateau Jacques-Cartier' district of the municipality. Close by, is the Allsopp House (late 18th century), an old seigneurial manor named after the Allsopp family, now a private property registered as a historical building.

The founder of the Congregation of the Sisters of Bon Pasteur, Marie Fitzbach, lived in Cap-Santé from 1826–1840. Gérard Morisset, architect and art historian, was also a resident, and designed the interiors of many of the region's churches.

Demographics 

Mother tongue:
 English as first language: 0.9%
 French as first language: 97.9%
 English and French as first language: 0.6%
 Other as first language: 0.4%

Citations

References

External links

 Town of Cap-Santé website

Cities and towns in Quebec
Incorporated places in Capitale-Nationale
1679 establishments in New France
1679 establishments in Canada
Canada geography articles needing translation from French Wikipedia